Humphrey Campbell (born 26 February 1958) is a Dutch singer and record producer of Surinamese descent, known for his participation in the 1992 Eurovision Song Contest.

Early career 
Campbell moved to the Netherlands in 1973 before Suriname's independence in 1975 and later studied and taught at the Hilversum Conservatorium.  He gained experience in musical theatre, working with singers such as Denise Jannah and Madeline Bell.

Eurovision Song Contest 
Campbell took part in the Dutch Eurovision selection in 1992, when his song Wijs me de weg (English version; Open your eyes) was chosen from 12 entrants as the country's representative in the 37th Eurovision Song Contest, held in Malmö, Sweden on 9 May. Performing last of the 23 entrants and joined on stage by brothers Carlo and Ben, Campbell finished the evening in ninth place. Campbell's backing singers in Malmö included Ruth Jacott; the following year Campbell would return the favour by appearing as a backing singer when Jacott represented the Netherlands in the 1993 Eurovision Song Contest. Campbell and Jacott would subsequently become a couple till 2011.

Later career 
Following his Eurovision appearances, Campbell concentrated on his career as a producer, although in 1997, under the name of CC Campbell with brothers Carlo and Charles, he released an album, Souls in Harmony.  This was not successful, and he returned to producing.  Campbell has worked with artists such as Judith Jobse and Rob de Nijs, as well as continuing to work with Jacott.

References

External links 

 1992 at Dingadong.nl (Dutch)
 

1958 births
Living people
20th-century Dutch male singers
Eurovision Song Contest entrants for the Netherlands
Eurovision Song Contest entrants of 1992
Surinamese emigrants to the Netherlands
20th-century Surinamese male singers
Nationaal Songfestival contestants